Eumicrotremus jindoensis is a species of lumpfish native to the Northwest Pacific, where it may be found off the coast of the Korean Peninsula and in the Yellow Sea. This species was described in 2017 as part of a review of "dwarf" species of Eumicrotremus, which reclassified the species then known as Lethotremus awae as a member of Eumicrotremus in addition to describing another similarly small new species, known as Eumicrotremus uenoi.

References 

Fish of the North Pacific
jindoensis
Taxa named by Tetsuji Nakabo
Fish described in 2017